The 1993 Senior League World Series took place from August 15–21 in Kissimmee, Florida, United States. La Vega, Dominican Republic defeated Taipei, Taiwan twice in the championship game.

Teams

Results

Winner's Bracket

Loser's Bracket

Placement Bracket

Elimination Round

References

Senior League World Series
Senior League World Series
1993 in sports in Florida